The ALCO C-643DH, also known as the Century 643DH, was a twin-engine diesel-hydraulic locomotive, the first diesel-hydraulic road switcher built in the United States. It had a C-C wheel arrangement and generated . Only three were built, all for Southern Pacific Railroad in 1964 (#9018–#9020). The Alco C-643DHs joined 21 Krauss-Maffei ML-4000 diesel-hydraulics already on the Southern Pacific's roster. They spent most of their service lives in the flat San Joaquin Valley in California.

Dissatisfaction over the poor performance of diesel-hydraulic locomotives, as well as their use of foreign-made components (the hydraulic transmission was of German Voith design), eventually led Southern Pacific to sell the 3 C-643DHs for scrap in 1973. None of the 3 examples built survived into preservation.

Original owners

See also 
 List of ALCO diesel locomotives
 ALCO Century 855

References

External links
 Alco Six-Axle Centuries Roster
 Southern Pacific DH-643

C-643DH
Diesel-hydraulic locomotives of the United States
C-C locomotives
Southern Pacific Railroad locomotives
Experimental locomotives
Railway locomotives introduced in 1964
Standard gauge locomotives of the United States
Scrapped locomotives